Clifford Newby-Harris (born 23 January 1995) is a Montserratian international footballer who plays for English club Bishop's Stortford, as a defender.

Career
Newby-Harris has played club football in England for Bishop's Stortford and Stansted.

He made his international debut for Montserrat in 2012, and competed in 2012 Caribbean Cup qualification.

References

1995 births
Living people
Montserratian footballers
Montserrat international footballers
Bishop's Stortford F.C. players
Stansted F.C. players
Association football defenders